Solidaridad Obrera could refer to:

Solidaridad Obrera (historical union), the union founded in 1907
Solidaridad Obrera (periodical), the newspaper founded in 1907
Confederación Sindical Solidaridad Obrera, the union founded in 1990